Helena is a 1924 German silent drama film directed by Manfred Noa and starring Edy Darclea, Vladimir Gajdarov and Albert Steinrück. The film was based on the poem the Iliad by Homer. It was released in two separate parts: The Rape of Helen and The Fall of Troy. It was produced by Bavaria Film at the Emelka Studios in Munich. The film was made on an epic scale with thousands of extras, and large sets which rivalled those of the larger Berlin-based UFA. For many years the film was considered partially lost until it was reconstructed from a version found in Swiss archives. The film has been described as Noa's "masterpiece," although it was so expensive that it seriously damaged the finances of Bavaria Film.

Cast
 Edy Darclea as Helena 
 Vladimir Gajdarov as Paris 
 Albert Steinrück as Priamos 
 Adele Sandrock as Hekabe 
 Carl de Vogt as Hektor 
 Friedrich Ulmer as Menelaos 
 Carlo Aldini as Achille 
 Carl Lamac as Patroklos 
 Karl Wüstenhagen as Agamemnon
 Hanna Ralph as Andromache 
 Albert Bassermann as Aisakos 
 Ferdinand Martini as Agelaos 
 Rudolf Meinhard-Jünger as Tersites 
 Otto Kronburger as Ulises

References

Bibliography
 Schildgen, Rachel A. More Than A Dream: Rediscovering the Life and Films of Vilma Banky. 1921 PVG Publishing, 2010.
 Winkler, Martin M (ed.). Troy: From Homer's Iliad to Hollywood Epic. John Wiley & Sons, 2009.

External links

1924 films
1920s historical drama films
German epic films
German historical drama films
Films of the Weimar Republic
German silent feature films
Films directed by Manfred Noa
Films based on the Iliad
Trojan War films
Films released in separate parts
Cultural depictions of Helen of Troy
Bavaria Film films
Films shot at Bavaria Studios
German black-and-white films
1924 drama films
Agamemnon
Silent drama films
Silent adventure films
Silent war films
1920s German films
1920s German-language films